Judacot was a messenger sent between 876 and  877 to the emperor Charles the Bald, and he was the first Catalan Jew mentioned in the history.

Bibliography 

Elnecavé, Nissim: Los hijos de Ibero-Franconia, La Luz, Buenos Aires, 1982, page 34.
enciclopedia.cat

9th-century people from the County of Barcelona
People from Catalonia
9th-century Jews from al-Andalus